Karl Heinrich Georg von Bistram or Karl Ivanovich Bistrom (Russian: Карл Иванович Бистром; 1770, Bad Kissingen - 16 June 1838, Bad Kissingen) was a commander in the Imperial Russian Army during the Napoleonic Wars. He was from a Germano-Baltic noble family and his younger brother Adam also served in the war.

External links
https://web.archive.org/web/20160422091700/http://www.museum.ru/1812/persons/slovar/index.html

Russian commanders of the Napoleonic Wars
1770 births
1838 deaths
Baltic-German people
Baltic nobility